Lee Richard Corso (born August 7, 1935) is an American sports broadcaster and football analyst for ESPN and a former coach. He has been a featured analyst on ESPN's College GameDay program since its inception in 1987. Corso served as the head football coach at the University of Louisville from 1969 to 1972, at Indiana University Bloomington from 1973 to 1982, and at Northern Illinois University in 1984, compiling a career college football coaching record of 73–85–6. He was the head coach for the Orlando Renegades of the United States Football League in 1985, tallying a mark of 5–13.

Early life and playing career
Corso's parents, Alessandro and Irma, were Italian immigrants. His father fled Italy during World War I at age 15. Alessandro, who had a second-grade education, was a lifelong laborer who laid terrazzo flooring, and Irma, who had a fifth-grade education, worked in school cafeterias and boarding schools.

Corso was born in Cicero, Illinois, on August 7, 1935. At age 10, he moved with his family to Miami and later attended Miami Jackson Senior High School, where he played quarterback. A baseball prospect, he was offered a $5,000 bonus to sign with the Brooklyn Dodgers as a shortstop. However, he chose college, playing football and baseball at Florida State University (FSU), where he was a roommate of football player and actor Burt Reynolds and future University of Miami baseball coach Ron Fraser. While at FSU, Corso earned the nickname "Sunshine Scooter" for his speed on the football field. As a defensive player, he set the school record for most career interceptions (14), a record that stood for more than two decades until it was broken by Monk Bonasorte. Corso was also a member of the Alpha Tau Omega fraternity. He was the starting quarterback for the South in the 1956 Blue-Gray Game, though his squad lost to the Len Dawson-led North team, 14–0.

Corso graduated with a bachelor's degree in physical education in 1957 and a master's degree in administration and supervision in 1958.

Coaching career

After college, Corso became the quarterbacks coach at Maryland under his former FSU coach Tommy Nugent. In 1962, Corso followed Nugent's guidance to recruit an academically and athletically qualified black player and convinced Darryl Hill to transfer from the Naval Academy, making him the first African-American football player in the Atlantic Coast Conference.

In 1966, Corso became the defensive backs coach at Navy. In 1969, he was named head coach at Louisville where he coached his ESPN colleague Tom Jackson. After taking Louisville to only its second-ever bowl game in 1970, he was hired by Indiana in 1972.

Corso coached at Indiana from 1973 to 1982, leading the Hoosiers to two winning seasons in 1979 and 1980. The 1979 regular season ended with 7–4 record and earned a trip to the 1979 Holiday Bowl. There the Hoosiers would beat the previously unbeaten Brigham Young Cougars. Indiana's victory over the Cougars propelled the team to 16th in the UPI poll, the Hoosiers' first top-20 ranking since 1967. During one game in the 1976 season, Corso called a time out after his team scored a touchdown early in the second quarter. The entire team huddled together for a photograph with the scoreboard filling the background. It read: Indiana 7, Ohio State 6. It was the first time in 25 years that the Hoosiers had led the Buckeyes in a football game. Ohio State would win the game 47-7. Corso's record was 41–68–2 over his ten years at Indiana.

Corso was the 16th head football coach at Northern Illinois University. In his lone season as Northern Illinois's head coach, Corso's record was 4–6–1.

After the stint at Northern Illinois, Corso made his professional football coaching debut for Orlando Renegades of the United States Football League (USFL) in 1985. Corso was slated to return to the Renegades when it was slated to return in fall 1986, but the league suspended operations before the season began.

Broadcasting career
In 1987, Corso was hired by ESPN as an analyst for its Saturday College GameDay program that originates from the site of one of the day's big games. He often plays the role of comic foil to co-hosts Desmond Howard, Rece Davis, and Kirk Herbstreit as they cover the major college football games from August until January. Corso's catchphrase, "Not so fast, my friend!", with pencil always in hand, is usually directed at Kirk Herbstreit, in disagreement with Herbstreit's predictions. Corso also calls nearly everyone "sweetheart."

Corso is also known for ending every weekly show with his mascot headgear prediction, when he chooses who he thinks will win the game at GameDay site by donning the headpiece of the school's mascot. It started on October 5, 1996, prior to the Ohio State-Penn State game at Columbus, Ohio, when he got the idea to don the OSU "Brutus Buckeye" mascot head to show his pick to win the game. Corso made his 250th headgear pick, TCU's Super Frog, before the TCU-WVU game in Morgantown, West Virginia, on November 1, 2014.

Corso makes a brief cameo in a 2006 Nike commercial featuring the fictional Briscoe High School football team, portrayed by football icons such as Michael Vick, LaDainian Tomlinson, Brian Urlacher, Troy Polamalu, and fellow FSU great Deion Sanders, and by coaches Don Shula, Jimmy Johnson, and Urban Meyer. Corso takes his hawk mascot head off while the game's deciding play unfolds in slow-motion.

Corso appeared annually in EA Sports' NCAA Football titles along with Herbstreit and play-by-play man Brad Nessler until NCAA Football 11, in which he does not do play-by-play. The 2006 edition of the game begins with Corso making his mascot headgear prediction. If the team Corso chooses does not have a mascot, he wears the helmet instead like on College GameDay. During play selection, players can opt for "Ask Corso", replicating the "Ask Madden" feature in the Madden NFL series.

Other work, charities, and personal life

In the off-season, Corso serves as Director of Business Development for Dixon Ticonderoga, a Florida-based manufacturer of writing and arts products, including No. 2 pencils (one of which he can always be seen holding on College GameDay). In 2001, Corso spearheaded an effort to create a crayon completely out of soybeans.

Corso serves as honorary chairman of Coaches Curing Kids' Cancer, a charity that raises money for pediatric cancer research through youth sports teams. Corso was honored with the National College Football Awards Association's Contributions to College Football Award "recognizing exceptional contributions to college football and a lifetime of achievement and integrity" during the Home Depot College Football Awards show at Walt Disney World on December 9, 2010. Growing up in Miami, Corso attended his local Boys' Club and is listed in the Boys & Girls Clubs of America Alumni Hall of Fame.

On May 16, 2009, Corso suffered a stroke at his Florida home, suffering partial paralysis. He spent three days in intensive care and a week in the hospital, followed by a lengthy rehabilitation. He was able to return to his ESPN College GameDay duties for the 2009 season. The stroke left him unable to speak for a month (his speech eventually recovered with few noticeable side effects) and severely slowed his cognitive function; since the stroke, Corso has had to script and rehearse his appearances on College GameDay and is no longer able to effectively ad lib.

While at Florida State, Corso was roommates and teammates with actor Burt Reynolds. The two remained close friends until Reynolds's death in 2018. 

Corso has been married to his wife, Betsy, since 1957. They have four children and ten grandchildren.

Head coaching record

College

USFL

References

External links
 
 

1935 births
Living people
American football quarterbacks
American sports businesspeople
Arena football announcers
College football announcers
ESPN people
Florida State Seminoles baseball players
Florida State Seminoles football coaches
Florida State Seminoles football players
Indiana Hoosiers football coaches
Louisville Cardinals football coaches
Maryland Terrapins football coaches
Navy Midshipmen football coaches
Northern Illinois Huskies football coaches
United States Football League announcers
United States Football League coaches
Miami Jackson Senior High School alumni
People from Cicero, Illinois
Sportspeople from Cook County, Illinois
Players of American football from Miami
Sports coaches from Miami
American people of Italian descent